Solo is the soundtrack to the 2017 Indian anthology film of the same name released in Malayalam and Tamil. Directed by Bejoy Nambiar, Solo consists of four shorter films in the anthology and was shot simultaneously in Tamil and Malayalam. Composers who worked on the film are Prashant Pillai, Thaikkudam Bridge, Masala Coffee, Gaurav Godkhindi, Agam, Filter Coffee, Brodha V, TaalAtma, Abhinav Bhansal, Sooraj Kurup and Sez on the Beat. The album has 22 songs in Malayalam, Tamil, Hindi and English. The whole soundtrack lasts about an hour.

Track listing

World of Shekhar
Tamil

Solo - World of Shekhars ensemble soundtrack comprises four tracks by various artists.

Malayalam

Solo - World of Shekhar'''s ensemble soundtrack comprises four tracks by various artists.

World of TrilokSolo - World of Triloks ensemble soundtrack comprises four tracks by various artists.

World of SivaSolo - World of Siva's ensemble soundtrack comprises four tracks by various artists.

World of RudraSolo - World of Rudra's ensemble soundtrack comprises four tracks by various artists.

 Release and reception 
Firstpost.com also gave the soundtrack a positive review and added "this album evidently has more than just one layer" and "though the Solo'' playlists combined last for almost an hour, many of the songs in them are worth your time".

Manorama Online called the album "highly addictive", adding the songs "belong to the fusion genre and make for a pleasant listening experience".

References 

2017 soundtrack albums
Malayalam film soundtracks